Ernest Terreau (31 May 1908 – 19 February 1983) was a French cyclist. A specialist in motor-paced racing, he was champion of France in this discipline in 1937, 1941 and 1943 and second in the world at the 1937 UCI Track Cycling World Championships.

He was born in Auxy, Saône-et-Loire and died in the 14th arrondissement of Paris.

Road titles 
 1932
 Circuit de Saône-et-Loire
 Critérium des As
 2nd in the Criterium du Midi
 1933
 3rd in the Critérium des As
 1934
 Bordeaux-Saintes
 3rd in the Circuit de l'Indre
 1935
 Critérium des As
 1936
 Critérium des As

Track titles

World Championships 
1937 UCI Track Cycling World Championships
 Silver medal at stayers

French Championships 
 1936
 2nd in Stayers
 1937
  French National Stayers Champion
 1941
  French National Stayers Champion
 1943
  French National Stayers Champion

Grand Prix
Grand Prix of the UVF in motor-paced racing : 1938
Grand Prix d'Auteuil : 1943

References

External links 
 

1908 births
French male cyclists
French track cyclists
1983 deaths